"(She's) Sexy + 17" is a 1983 song by the Stray Cats, released by EMI America in July 1983 as the lead single from the album Rant N' Rave with the Stray Cats. The song became their 3rd and last top 10 hit, reaching No. 5 on the Billboard Hot 100 singles chart. It also reached No. 2 on the Billboard Top Rock Tracks chart for one week, and No. 29 in the UK Singles Chart.

Cash Box called the song "an exciting new single" with "a shakin’ rockabilly production."

Charts

Weekly charts

Year-end charts

References

1983 singles
Stray Cats songs
Songs written by Brian Setzer
1983 songs
EMI America Records singles